The Taisto-class motor torpedo boats or T class was a series of motor torpedo boats, which saw service with the Finnish Navy during World War II. Following the war, the Paris Peace Treaty of 1947 prohibited the Finnish Navy from employing torpedo-carrying vessels of any kind and the Taisto class were converted into motor gunboats. By 1964, all vessels of the class had been removed from service.

Background and description 
Following the invasion of the Soviet Union by Germany in World War II, the war between Finland and the Soviet Union began again. The Finnish Navy, tasked with closing the Gulf of Finland, sought more vessels. Based on an Italian design and built under license, eight Taisto vessels were manufactured at Turun Veneveistämö. All eight vessels were launched between 1943 and 1946. They mounted two  torpedo tubes and one  Madsen gun.

Vessels in class

Service history
The Paris Peace Treaty of 1947 was signed following the end of World War II, and Finland was prohibited by the treaty from having torpedo-carrying vessels. The Taisto class were converted to motor gunboats with their torpedo armament and 20 mm gun being removed and the vessels receiving one  gun and two  guns. There is some debate amongst the sources over the fate of the ships. Westerlund & Chumbley state that by 1964 all eight vessels had been stricken from the Finnish Navy. However, Blackman states that only three had been discarded by 1964 and that four others were only removed from service in 1966.

Notes

Citations

References 

 
 
 
 

Torpedo boats of the Finnish Navy
Torpedo boat classes